Raymonde Vincent (1908, Luant, Indre – 1985, Saint-Chartier, Indre) was a French woman of letters. She won the Prix Femina in 1937 for her novel .

Biography 
Originally from Berry, Raymonde Vincent was born near Châteauroux in a family of farmers. When her mother died, she held the house of her father, a métayer operating a farm belonging to a castle. Catechism aside, her instruction was neglected. At seventeen she left for Paris where she found a job in commerce. She met Albert Béguin (1901–1957), an academic who became a renowned essayist, critic and translator, whom she married in 1929.

In a few years, Raymonde Vincent caught up the deficiency of her studies and took interest in painting, music and theater. However, it was the nostalgia of her peasant past that inspired her most outstanding work: Campagne for which the Prix Femina was awarded to her in 1937.

Work 
 1937: Campagne, Prix Femina 
 1939: Blanche, Éditions Stock
 1943: Elisabeth, Éditions Stock.
 1945: Seigneur, retirez-moi d'entre les morts, Éditions Egloff.
 1950: Les noces du matin, Éditions du Seuil
 1962: La couronne des innocents, Éditions du Seuil
 1977: Les Terres heureuses Éditions Julliard
 1982: Le Temps d'apprendre à vivre, Éditions de La bouinotte
 1991: Hélène, series "Voyage immobile" Éditions Christian Pirot (posthumous)

External links 
 Campagne on Babelio
 Raymonde Vincent à Luant on Éditions Alexandrines
 Et si on redécouvrait Raymonde Vincent ?

1908 births
1985 deaths
20th-century French non-fiction writers
20th-century French women writers
Prix Femina winners
People from Indre